The Journal of Occupational and Organizational Psychology is a quarterly peer-reviewed academic journal published by Wiley-Blackwell on behalf of the British Psychological Society. It covers all aspects of occupational and organizational psychology, and also includes behavioral and cognitive aspects of industrial relations and human factors and ergonomics. The journal is also an outlet for articles in the management fields of organizational behavior and human resource management. It was established in 1922 as Occupational Psychology and was renamed Journal of Occupational Psychology in 1975 when ownership was transferred to the British Psychological Society.

Abstracting and indexing
The journal is abstracted and indexed in:

According to the Journal Citation Reports, the journal has a 2017 impact factor of 4.561.

References

External links

Publications established in 1922
English-language journals
Occupational psychology journals
Quarterly journals
Wiley-Blackwell academic journals
British Psychological Society academic journals